Justice League Europe (JLE) is a comic book series published by DC Comics that was a spin-off of the comic book Justice League America (which was then named Justice League International (vol. 1) for issues #7 to #25).

Justice League Europe was published for 68 issues (plus five Annuals) from 1989 to 1994. Starting with issue #51 the title was renamed Justice League International (vol. 2). Like Justice League America, the series featured tongue-in-cheek humor but was a much more action-centric series than Justice League America. The action-themed nature of the series was most overt with the series' most famous arc "The Extremists". The arc featured the JLE fighting The Extremists, a cadre of psychopathic villains patterned after Marvel Comics villains Doctor Doom, Magneto, Doctor Octopus, Sabretooth and Dormammu.

The team was originally headquartered in Paris, France but later moved to an abandoned castle in Great Britain.

History

The Old World Team
After the membership of the Justice League had grown to an unwieldy number of characters, DC split it into two teams. The original Justice League Europe consists of:

Captain Atom (field commander)
Elongated Man
Power Girl
Flash (Wally West)
Rocket Red
Animal Man
Metamorpho
 Catherine Cobert (bureau chief)
Sue Dibny (information manager, later bureau chief)

Later members of the original team include:
Crimson Fox (joined issue #10)
Blue Jay (joined issue #19)
Silver Sorceress (joined issue #19)

Justice League: Breakdowns
"Breakdowns" was a 15-issue crossover between the Justice League America and Justice League Europe titles, revising the organization.

Maxwell Lord is initially in a coma from a failed assassination attempt. He is later possessed by JLE foe Dreamslayer of the Extremists. Following the end of the Breakdowns saga, he has no more mental powers, apparently drained completely when possessed by Dreamslayer.

The Queen Bee, ruler of the country Bialya, is killed in a coup d'état led by Sumaan Harjavti, the twin brother of the original dictator ruler, Rumaan. 

Despero awakens and escapes Manga Khan's starship to wreak havoc on New York City, seeking vengeance against the Justice League. A force of the Justice League's best (Martian Manhunter, Power Girl, Fire, Rocket Red, Metamorpho, Flash, Guy Gardner, Major Disaster) with the Conglomerate (led by Booster Gold) and Lobo were unable to stop him. Ultimately, it was Kilowog and L-Ron who subdued Despero by transferring L-Ron's consciousness into the cybernetic control collar that remained around his neck.

While possessing Maxwell Lord's body, Dreamslayer kidnaps and later murders Mitch Wacky on the island of Kooey Kooey Kooey, where the Blue Beetle and Booster Gold previously attempted to open a resort called "Club JLI". Using Lord's persona, Dreamslayer lures a large portion of the Justice League to the island and takes mental control of them, making them the "new Extremists".

The Silver Sorceress, one of the former Champions of Angor and Justice League member, dies defeating Dreamslayer. Her gravesite is on the island of KooeyKooeyKooey.

The U.N. withdraws its support from the Justice League and it disbands. The Martian Manhunter seemingly takes a leave of absence, although later re-emerges under the persona of Bloodwynd.

Also, the Breakdowns storyline reorganized the JLE. The team relocated to London and several characters left or were replaced. The new lineup starting in issue #37, led by Green Lantern (Hal Jordan) consisted of:

Flash (Wally West)
Aquaman
Dr. Light
Power Girl
Crimson Fox
Elongated Man (and Sue)

Expansion
The release of Justice League Spectacular launched the revised Justice League titles with new writers and artists. The Justice League titles expanded to four by June 1993: Justice League America (formerly Justice League International), Justice League Europe (retitled as the second volume of Justice League International), Justice League Quarterly, and Justice League Task Force. In late 1994 Justice League International and Justice League Quarterly were cancelled and replaced by a new monthly title in January 1995, Extreme Justice. 

With new writers and artists in the various titles coming and going, there was little consistency in continuity and quality. The more powerful and recognizable characters such as Superman, Green Lantern (Hal Jordan), and Batman came and went out of the various Justice League titles, replaced by new or lesser known characters such as Bloodwynd, Maya, Maxima, Nuklon, Obsidian, Tasmanian Devil and Triumph. Longtime JLI-era characters such as Captain Atom, Martian Manhunter and Power Girl were revised and revamped repeatedly, with mixed reviews by the readers.

In the summer of 1996, with sales fading, all three remaining monthly series were cancelled and replaced by JLA.

Doomsday Clock
In the Watchmen sequel Doomsday Clock, the world starts a metahuman arms race in light of "The Superman Theory" as France has the Justice League Europe. It is mentioned that its members are Crimson Fox, Fleur-de-Lis, Hunchback, Musketeer, Nightrunner, and Thief of Arts.

Recurring characters
 Power Girl's cat
Batman
 Inspector Camus
 Mitch Wacky
 Beefeater
 Duke Donald
 Godfrey (also known as Gaius)
 Erewhon
 Lionheart
 Seneca
 Osiris

After Justice League Europe

La Fraternité de Justice et Liberté
Some time after the cancellation of the series, it was revealed in an issue of Starman that Justice League Europe was being reformed (as La Fraternité de Justice et Liberté). The new team consisted of Crimson Fox, Amazing-Man, Blue Devil, Firestorm, and Icemaiden. Icemaiden turned out to be Nash, daughter of The Mist who destroyed the team forever when she murdered Crimson Fox, Blue Devil, and Amazing Man (Blue Devil was later restored to life by Sebastian Faust). It was revealed that Mist covertly contacted Icemaiden and informed her of a supposed threat facing her homeland of Norway, and she must defeat the threat without informing anyone until afterwards. Icemaiden left during the middle of the night, and Mist replaced her within the JLE by the next morning. The JLE did not know that Mist replaced Icemaiden until Mist began her attacks against them. Mist informed Crimson Fox that the threat she informed Icemaiden about was not real, and that she had sent Icemaiden on an ultimately fruitless search so that she could disguise herself as Icemaiden and replace her on the team.

Crimson Fox (Constance D'Aramis)
Firestorm (Ronnie Raymond)
Blue Devil
Icemaiden (never actually appeared)
Amazing-Man (Will Everett III)

JLA Showcase #1
In 1999 Greg Weisman wrote a story for DC Comics' JLA Showcase #1, cover-dated February 2000. The one-shot consists of various Justice League stories; Weisman's was set during the time of the Justice League Europe and titled "Flashback Of Notre Dame". The story has Captain Atom, the JLE and Bette Sans Souci/Plastique meeting a group of gargoyles at Notre Dame Cathedral. After the usual misunderstanding/battle, the JLE help the gargoyles return to their home island of Brigadoon.

 Captain Atom
 Flash
 Kilowog
 Metamorpho
 Blue Jay

Formerly Known as the Justice League / I Can't Believe It's Not the Justice League

Several members of this incarnation of the Justice League later formed the Super Buddies, whose humorous adventures were featured in the mini-series Formerly Known as the Justice League and later again in the title JLA: Classified with a story called I Can't Believe It's Not the Justice League.

Writers
 Keith Giffen:  #1-35, Annual #1
 J.M. DeMatteis: #1-9, 13, Annual #1
 William Messner-Loebs: #10-13
 Gerard Jones: #14-50, Annual #2-3

Collected editions

In other media
 In a parody of the Super Friends, the sketch "That's What Superfriends Are For" on Mad features the founding team of Justice League Europe (minus Rocket Red and Metamorpho).
 In the show Powerless, Beatriz Bonilla, a.k.a. Fire, tells Emily that she was accepted by the group; while Emily is happy for her, she tells her the group is not in the top five of Justice Leagues.

See also
List of Justice League members

References

External links

1989 comics debuts
Comics by J. M. DeMatteis
Comics by Keith Giffen
Europe
Comics spin-offs